Kotozawa Choseichi Dam (琴沢調整池) is a rockfill dam located in Aichi Prefecture in Japan. The dam is used for irrigation. The catchment area of the dam is 0.2 km2. The dam impounds about 1  ha of land when full and can store 74 thousand cubic meters of water. The construction of the dam was started on 1969 and completed in 1981.

References

Dams in Aichi Prefecture
1981 establishments in Japan